"Lucas with the Lid Off" is a song by Danish rapper Lucas Secon that was released as the lead single from his second album, Lucacentric (1994). It features a sample from the 1935 Benny Goodman song "When Buddha Smiles". The song was a hit in the United States, reaching number 29 on the Billboard Hot 100 and number 22 on the Billboard Modern Rock Tracks chart. It was most successful in Australia, where it reached number 15, and it peaked within the top 40 in Canada, Iceland, New Zealand, and the United Kingdom.

The music video for the song was directed by the French film maker Michel Gondry and was nominated for a Grammy Award for Best Music Video  at the 37th Annual Grammy Awards.

Music video
The black and white music video for the song is known for its technical achievement in that it was shot in one long continuous single take with no edits, cuts or digital enhancement. In an RES magazine interview, Gondry explained:

"Michel called this video 'a big turn for me, because it was so challenging. Nobody really believed - even me - that we could pull that off when we made it after 17 takes, because it was really done all in-camera in one shot. There is no post-production at all. I think this one really gave me a lot of attention.'"

Lucas with the Lid Off was nominated in the Best Music Video (short form) category at the 37th Grammy Awards, (Produced by Michel Gondry whom had two music videos nominated at the 37th Grammy Awards. Sinead O'Connor‘s Fire On Babylon music video was also nominated)

The video was also received a MTV Video Music Award nomination for Best Male Video at the 1995 MTV Video Music Awards, and was No. 20 in Slant Magazine’s 100 Greatest Music Videos.

Charts

Cover versions
On the album A Century of Song (Polyholiday Records), the song was covered by the American band La Musique Populaire. It was performed in the form of a spoof in an episode of the PBS series Bill Nye the Science Guy in 1995, but renamed "Whether the Weather" as part of the episode's scientific lesson about climates.

References

External links
 Michel Gondry official website: videos: 'Lucas With The Lid Off'

1994 songs
1994 singles
Big Beat Records (American record label) singles
Black-and-white music videos
Electro swing songs
Jazz rap songs
Music videos directed by Michel Gondry
Songs with lyrics by Arthur Freed
Songs with music by Nacio Herb Brown
Songs written by Lucas Secon